Darreh Key may refer to:
 Darreh Key Ali Khani
 Darreh Key Salehi